Clash of the Gods is the 16th album from German heavy metal band Grave Digger, which was released on 31 August 2012 via Napalm Records.

Track listing
All lyrics written by Chris Boltendahl.

Note
The Japanese, Russian and Brazilian editions contain the Home At Last EP.

Charts

Personnel
 Chris Boltendahl - vocals
 Axel Ritt - guitars
 Jens Becker - bass
 Stefan Arnold - drums
 H.P. Katzenburg - keyboards

Additional musicians
 Hacky Hackmann - backing vocals
 Stefan Schmidt - backing vocals
 Ross Thompson - backing vocals
 Das Letzte Einhorn - lead vocals on "Charon (Fährmann des Todes)"

Production
 Jens Howorka - photography
 Gyula Havancsák - cover art, artwork
 Jörg Umbreit - producer, engineering, mixing, mastering
 Axel Ritt - producer, engineering
 Chris Boltendahl - producer, cover concept
 Loreley von Rhein - art model ("Death Angel")

References

Grave Digger (band) albums
2012 albums
Napalm Records albums